Rhododendron watsonii (无柄杜鹃) is a rhododendron species native to southern Gansu and western Sichuan in China, where it grows at altitudes of . The flowers are white.

References
 "Rhododendron watsonii", Hemsley & E. H. Wilson, Bull. Misc. Inform. Kew. 1910: 112. 1910.

watsonii